Macauley Cook (born 31 December 1991) is a Welsh rugby union player. A flanker or lock forward, he plays club rugby for the Jersey Reds having previously played for his country, Cardiff and Cardiff Blues.  He is a fluent Welsh speaker.

References

External links
Cardiff Blues profile

1991 births
Living people
Cardiff RFC players
Cardiff Rugby players
Rugby union players from Church Village
Welsh rugby union players
Jersey Reds players
Rugby union flankers